Essam (Arabic: عِصام ‘iṣām) is an Arabic male given name and surname. It means "defended; protected; well-preserved; well-protected; well-kept; preserved; reserved; safeguarded".

Surname
Notable people with the surname Essam include:
 Chloe Essam (born 1999), English netball player
 Connor Essam (born 1992), English footballer
 Mohamed Essam (Egyptian footballer) (born 1994), Egyptian footballer
 Ramy Essam (born 1987), Egyptian musician
 Shehab Essam (born 1995), Egyptian squash player

Given name
Notable people with the given name Essam include:

 Essam Abdel-Azim (born 1970), Egyptian footballer
 Essam Dhahi (born 1983), Emirati footballer
 Essam El Hadary (born 1973), Egyptian footballer
 Essam Heggy (born 1975), Egyptian space scientist
 Essam E. Khalil (born 1948), Egyptian engineer and academic
 Essam Marei (born 1965), Egyptian footballer
 Essam Sharaf (born 1952), Egyptian academic
 Essam Tharwat (born 1986), Egyptian footballer
 Essam Yassin (born 1987), Iraqi footballer

References